VH may refer to:

 V H Group, an Indian diversified company
 VH, Australian aircraft registration prefix
 V, a series of the Chrysler Valiant automobile
 Aston Martin V platform, a sports car automobile platform
 Holden V Commodore, an automobile introduced by Holden in 1981
 Nissan V engine, built by Nissan Motor Corporation from 1989 to 2001
 Viva Air Colombia (2009-2012, IATA airline code VH)
 Van Halen, an American hard rock band